King of Majesty is the third live praise and worship album by Hillsong United.

Reception 

In March 2002 Trevor Kirk of Cross Rhythms rated the album as 5 out of 10 and opined that the group has "shown a tendency to formulaic ruts rather than radical grooves".

Track listing
 "King Of Majesty" (Marty Sampson) - 04:39
 "Most High" (Reuben Morgan) - 06:14
 "Everything To Me" (Marty Sampson) - 04:14
 "Your Spirit" (Luke Munns) - 05:19
 "I Adore" (Reuben Morgan) - 04:25
 "Fall" (Rebecca Mesiti) - 06:16
 "God Is Great" (Marty Sampson) - 04:13
 "Lift" (Ben McFall) - 03:45
 "Perfect King" (Damian Bassett) - 07:02
 "Holy, Holy, Holy" (traditional) - 03:28
 "Did You Feel The Mountains Tremble?" (Martin Smith) - 04:58

References 

Hillsong United albums
2001 live albums

pt:King of Majesty